David Carroll may refer to:

 David Carroll (actor) (1950–1992), American actor
 David Carroll (biker) (1952–????), Canadian gangster
 David Carroll (musician) (1913–2008), American composer and musical director
 Dave Carroll (musician), musician in Sons of Maxwell
 David Carroll (naturalist) (born 1942), American naturalist author and illustrator
 David Carroll (physicist) (born 1963), American physicist
 David Williamson Carroll (1816–1905), colonel in the Confederate Army and member of the Congress of the Confederate States of America
 David Carroll, who pleaded guilty to the murder of his foster son Marcus Fiesel
 David Carroll, a fictional detective created by Octavus Roy Cohen in the 1920s
 David Carroll (whistleblower), American professor and whistleblower; see Emerdata